The King's School is a secondary school and sixth form located in Ottery St Mary, Devon, England. It was established as a choir school by the bishop John Grandisson in 1335, but was replaced by a grammar school by Henry VIII in 1545. It became a comprehensive school in 1982, and an academy in 2011. The school's pupils are mainly drawn from its five feeder primaries in the surrounding area: Ottery St Mary primary school, West Hill Primary School, Payhembury Church of England Primary School, Feniton Church of England Primary School and Tipton St John Church of England Primary School.

The school has access to facilities shared with the public, the Colin Tooze Sports Centre. Rob Gammon became headteacher in 2016, succeeding Faith Jarrett.

History 
The King's School is an 11-18 secondary school with just over 1100 students and 100 staff. In 1335, Bishop John de Grandisson bought the manor of Ottery St Mary from the Dean and Chapter of Rouen who had owned it since 1061. He obtained a royal licence from Edward III to found his College of Secular Canons and established a choir school in Ottery St Mary in 1335 for eight boys and a Master of Grammar. The school did not start very promisingly in 1337 with the members of the choir-school being accused of "dissolute and insolent behaviour in the parish". Grandisson being a disciplinarian, flogging was the punishment, but this had no effect and consequently the boys were heavily fined for every day's absence from the choir. For over two hundred years the canons carried out Bishop Grandisson's instructions and the choir school boys were educated.

When the English Reformation reached the college in 1545 it was dissolved. Upon some whim or persuasion, however, Henry VIII established a free grammar school in the town - hence "The King's School" and their coat of arms became a Lion and a Dragon supporting the Tudor Royal Shield surmounted by a Crown.

The Chanter's House is a Grade II* listed building which served as the headmaster's lodging. It dates from the 17th century, incorporating parts of the former Precentor's house, known as Heath's Court. In 1645, Oliver Cromwell held a convention in the house's dining room, and Thomas Fairfax stayed at the house from October to December in that year.

The poet Samuel Taylor Coleridge's father was headmaster of The King's School, Ottery St Mary.

Facilities 
The school has access to a facility shared by the public, the Colin Tooze Sports Centre. The King's School was designated as a Specialist Sports College in the summer of 2002. Facilities for PE and sport at King's were enabled by that status to be developed. In partnership with East Devon District Council, a purpose built Dance Studio with sound and lighting systems was completed in 2003. There is a floodlight all-weather astroturf hockey and football pitch.

In 2009 the school added a new Multi Use Games Areas (M.U.G.A) which has four netball courts and three tennis courts which are also used by the local Ottery St Mary tennis club.

House system
There are four houses, which date to 1912, as witnessed by the old minute book of the Sports Committee. These provide the school with four large vertically grouped cohorts of students, with form groups separated by house rather than year.

The houses are named after local families: Coleridge, Kennaway, Patteson and
Raleigh.

All houses have separate colours, which are used for inter-house events: red for Coleridge, blue for Kennaway, green for Patteson and purple for Raleigh. The school holds annual inter-house events, these include dance, musical and the 'Top Of The House' quiz.

Key dates 

 1900 - 28 boys – Headteacher Mr Frank Wyatt of Dawlish.
 1906 - Two classrooms – full forms
 1907 - Scheme to transfer the school to a new building and convert it to a co-educational grammar school.
 1909-ish - Current site bought for £557 16s 3d., from Exeter Episcopal Charities.
 1911 - Contract for new school – W J Granger of Whimple – for £6275.
 1912 - 23 January 1912 – new school opened. The old school site of The Priory was let for £40 – eventually became the Police Station.
 1920 - School's first girl graduate – E Joyce Seward.
 1921 - 285 pupils – mainly fee paying, with some free places.
 1924 - James Johnson of Melton Mowbray succeeded Mr Wyatt as Headteacher.
 1927 - Only 99 boys and 44 girls in attendance.
 1934 - Nine boys went on a school cruise to Norway and Denmark.
 1935 - Electric lights replaced gas.
 1937 - New cricket pavilion.
 1939 - 86 evacuees came to the school. Trenches were dug to accommodate the whole school.
 1945 - Incident with local farmer over drainage problems. £20 settled the issue!
 1946 - Mr. Crowther appointed Headteacher.
 1947 - New dining rooms – Miss Pollard – Cook-Supervisor.
 1950 - Mr. Sydney Andrew becomes Headteacher.
 1953 - New Library/Art Block – girls playground asphalted.
 1955-56 - New Chemistry/Biology block.
 1958 - Mains water. Entry of 75 to First Year. The Sixth Form was 40.
 1963 - New Hall, Library, Changing Rooms, new Physics Laboratory.
 1966 - Swimming Pool built.
 1972 - Dr. M E Denning appointed Headteacher.
 1976 - New Craft Block built.
 1982 - Drama, Art, Music and Science provision increased. School intake became non-selective.
 1988 - Final grammar school entrants complete Sixth Form; school population all non-selective. Mr. Larry Watkins appointed Headteacher.
 1989 - Mr. Barry Teare appointed Headteacher.
 1996 - New teaching block for Geography, History, RE and Foreign Languages.
 1997 - Mr. Roger Fetherston appointed Headteacher.
 2001 - New Dining Hall added to the Humanities & Language Block/Reception Area greatly expanded.
 2002 - Sport College Status achieved.
 2003 - New Teaching Rooms for Math & English and a New Dance Studio added to the Colin Tooze Sports Centre.
 2004 - Miss Faith Jarrett appointed as Headteacher. The school now has just over 1010 students.
 2009 - New Geography Rooms and Sixth Form Centre built.
 2011 - Awarded Outstanding Status by Ofsted, became an academy.
 2013 - New Business Studies, ICT, PSHE and English Rooms built in a New-Block extension
 2016 - Mr. Rob Gammon appointed headteacher

Notable former pupils
Walter Raleigh (–1618), writer, poet, soldier, courtier, explorer
Samuel Taylor Coleridge (1772–1834), poet, critic, philosopher
Paul Madden (born 1959), British diplomat
Mary King (born 1961), eventer 
Murray McArthur (born 1966), actor
Joanne Pavey (born 1973), long-distance runner

References

External links
 School website

Educational institutions established in the 1540s
1335 establishments in England
1545 establishments in England
Secondary schools in Devon
Academies in Devon
Ottery St Mary